The 1989 Esso RAC British Touring Car Championship was the 32nd season of the championship. This season was the final year of the four separate class format, with the championship changing to just two classes for 1990. There were a total of thirteen rounds with the best eleven scores for each driver counting towards the championship. The title was won by John Cleland with a works Vauxhall Astra GTE 16V.

Teams & Drivers